Abdelrafik Gérard (born 8 June 1993) is a French footballer who last played for Gabala FK as a midfielder.

Career

Club
On 30 January 2020, Gabala FK announced the signing of Gérard on an 18-month contract.

Personal life
Gérard was born in France to a Reunnionais father, and an Algerian mother.

Career statistics

Club

References

1993 births
Living people
People from Ivry-sur-Seine
Association football midfielders
French footballers
French sportspeople of Algerian descent
Ligue 2 players
US Créteil-Lusitanos players
RC Lens players
Royale Union Saint-Gilloise players
Footballers from Val-de-Marne
French expatriate sportspeople in Azerbaijan
Gabala FC players